Ferribacterium limneticum is a gram negative, obligately anaerobe, Fe(III)-reducing, motil bacterium from the genus of Azonexus which was isolated from mining impacted lake sediments.

References

Rhodocyclaceae